Dancing in the Storm may refer to:

"Dancing in the Storm" (song), 1990 song by Australian band Boom Crash Opera
Dancing in the Storm (album), 2009 album by Boom Crash Opera
Dancing in the Storm (TV series), 2018 Chinese TV series